Roger Boyle may refer to:
Roger Boyle, 1st Earl of Orrery (1621–1679), British soldier, statesman and dramatist
Roger Boyle, 2nd Earl of Orrery (1646–1682), Irish peer and politician
Roger Boyle (bishop) (1617?–1687), Irish Protestant churchman, Bishop of Down and Connor and of Clogher
E. Roger Boyle (1908–1993), American author and scholar of drama